Gerardo Omar Castillo Zamorano (born 19 November 1986), known as Gerardo Castillo, is a Mexican former football centre back who last played for Dorados de Sinaloa in the Ascenso MX. Castillo was born in Mexico City and started his career at Real Colima.

Castillo made his debut for Atlante on September 29, 2007, against Deportivo Toluca. He had caught the attention of manager José Guadalupe Cruz, while playing for Atlante's filial team in Colima. The game ended in a 2–0 win for the Potros.

Honours
Atlante
Apertura 2007

Notes

References

External links

1986 births
Living people
Liga MX players
Atlante F.C. footballers
Dorados de Sinaloa footballers
Association football defenders
Footballers from Mexico City
Mexican footballers